KBLN-TV (channel 30) is a religious television station licensed to Grants Pass, Oregon, United States, serving the Medford area as an affiliate of the Three Angels Broadcasting Network (3ABN). Owned by Better Life Television, the station maintains studios on Northeast 9th Street in Grants Pass and a transmitter on Grants Pass Peak.

KBLN-TV is seen in five counties in Southern Oregon, plus Siskiyou County in northern California. It is a viewer-supported non-profit outreach organization of the Seventh-day Adventist Church, with a 501(c)(3) status.

Technical information

Subchannels
The station's digital signal is multiplexed:

Analog-to-digital conversion
Because it was granted an original construction permit after the FCC finalized the DTV allotment plan on April 21, 1997, the station did not receive a companion channel for a digital television station. Instead, at the end of digital TV conversion, KBLN-TV shut down its analog signal, over UHF channel 30, and "flash-cut" its digital signal into operation UHF channel 30.

Translators

Expansion
 In 2007, KBLN announced plans to purchase a full power station in Roseburg and a low-powered repeater station in Eugene, to expand coverage to more than 500,000 viewers in the Eugene market. In 2009, the stations, KTVC and Eugene translator KAMK-LP, were sold to KBLN during a bankruptcy auction for Equity Media Holdings. Plans for this expansion were announced by Better Life before Equity's economic woes came to light.
 In 2009, according to its website, Better Life "negotiated and signed an agreement to purchase a low power digital station in the Portland area." However, the site then failed to mention which station it was intending to purchase. It was not clear if the station was in talks with a particular station, or with many stations in the region. On March 23, 2010, the FCC granted Consent to Assignment for KEVE-LP channel 36 from Fiori Media, Inc. to the Southern Oregon Conference Assn. of Seventh-Day Adventists. KEVE-LP, at the time licensed to Longview, Washington, held a construction permit to move to the Portland area, while changing its city of license to Vancouver, Washington. The station would sign on October 24, 2010 as KEVE-LD.
 In 2011, Better Life acquired a low-powered station in Redding, California, K33HH channel 33, from the Northern California Conference Association of Seventh-Day Adventists; previously, the translator carried 3ABN programming directly via satellite. Also that year, Better Life leased a subchannel on FMI Media's KNRC-LD in Reno, Nevada, where it can be seen on subchannel 14.5.
 A chain of low-power stations owned by One Ministries, Inc. (led by KKPM-CD) simulcast KBLN's Better Life TV programming throughout Northern California.

See also
KEVE-LD
KTVC
Media ministries of the Seventh-day Adventist Church

References

External links

Three Angels Broadcasting Network
Television channels and stations established in 2001
BLN-TV
Grants Pass, Oregon
2001 establishments in Oregon
Seventh-day Adventist media